Coutil (or Coutille) is a ticking-woven cloth used to make corsets, table covers, mattresses, tents, and other types of resistant garments.

Description 
Coutil has a high cotton content. Cotton has good dimensional stability, or a resistance to stretching, which makes it a good choice for such a stressed garment. Coutil may be made to be plain (similar to 100% cotton facing), satin, or brocade.  It is common for coutil to have a herringbone texture, or a similar woven texture.

Cotton coutil is a derivative of the common cotton fabric, which was used along with linen, cotton canvas, brocade and silk. With recent technologies, petroleum residues from disposed plastic bottles are mixed with cotton to create a high-tech fiber fit for the production of coutil.

History 
The Edwardian era in particular was quite innovative in the fabrics that they used to create summer corsets. While England was a productive maker of coutil during that period, all coutil mills have closed since then.

Historically, coutil was also called "Jean". In the Basque region that sits across France and Spain, the Basque cloth (linge basque, not to be confused with a Basque) was called the Béarnese coutil (coutil béarnais) up until the 1920s and was primarily used to cover the livestock before becoming a distinguished piece of tableware. In 1913, in Orthez in France, a coutil pants (coutil-pantalon) shop opened, which also became a table cloth shop during the early 1920s.

See also 

 Ticking

References

Woven fabrics
Corsetry